Porphyromonas gulae  is a Gram-negative, anaerobic, non-spore-forming, rod-shaped and non-motile bacterium from the genus of Porphyromonas which has been isolated from the gingival sulcus of a wolf in Canada.

References 

Bacteroidia
Bacteria described in 2001